Eu Sei que Vou Te Amar was released in 1994 in Brazil by João Gilberto. It was recorded live at Heineken Concerts, present by TV Cultura.

Track listing

Personnel 
 Guitar/Vocals - João Gilberto

References 

Gridley, Mark. Jazz Styles: History and Analysis. 9th. NJ: Pearson Prentice Hall, Print.

João Gilberto albums
Antônio Carlos Jobim albums
1994 albums